The Presidium of the Political Bureau of the Workers' Party of Korea, or simply the Presidium, and formerly known as the Standing Committee  (1946–61), is a committee consisting of the top leadership of the Workers' Party of Korea. Historically, it has been composed of one to five members, and currently has five members. Its officially mandated purpose is to conduct policy discussions and make decisions on major issues when the Politburo, a larger decision-making body, is not in session. While the Presidium in theory reports to the Politburo, which in turn reports to the larger Central Committee, in practice the Presidium is supreme over its parent bodies and acts as the most powerful decision-making body in North Korea. As North Korea is a one-party state, the Presidium's decisions de facto have the force of law. Its role is roughly analogous to that of the Politburo Standing Committee of the Chinese Communist Party.

History
The Presidium was revitalized at the 3rd Conference, with four new members appointed: Kim Yong-nam (President of the Presidium of the Supreme People's Assembly, head of state), Choe Yong-rim (Premier, head of government), Vice Marshal Jo Myong-rok (Director of the General Political Bureau of the Korean People's Army) and Vice Marshal Ri Yong-ho (Chief of the General Staff). The appointment of two military officers was considered by outside observers to be in line with Kim Jong-il's military-first politics. It was believed that Ri Yong-ho was Kim Jong-un's personal military escort at the time, similar to O Jin-u's role during Kim Jong-il's early rule. At the 4th Conference, Chasu Choe Ryong-hae was appointed to the Standing Committee.

Current members

References

Footnotes

Bibliography

Politburo of the Workers' Party of Korea
Politics of North Korea